State Highway 177 (SH 177) is a Colorado state highway in Douglas and Arapahoe counties. SH 177's southern terminus is at SH 470 in Greenwood Village, and the northern terminus is at U.S. Route 285 (US 285) in Cherry Hills Village.

Route description
SH 177 runs , starting at an interchange with  SH 470. The highway, also known as South University Boulevard, runs north through Centennial and Greenwood Village. It crosses SH 88 (Belleview Avenue) and enters Cherry Hills Village, passing Cherry Hills Country Club just before the state highway ends at  US 285. The route north continues as South University Boulevard.

Major intersections

References

External links

177
Transportation in Douglas County, Colorado
Transportation in Arapahoe County, Colorado
Greenwood Village, Colorado